"Avenir" is the second single by French singer and actress Louane from her debut studio album Chambre 12. The song was released as digital EP and digital download on December 1, 2014, and January 5, 2015, respectively. On October 30, 2015, a CD single was issued in Austria, Germany and Switzerland.

It is Louane's most successful single to date, topping the charts in her native France. It was the first time that a reality show contestant landed a number-one single in France since Sheryfa Luna's "Il avait les mots" in 2008. It also reached number one in Luxembourg, and the top 10 in Austria, Belgium, Germany and Slovakia.

Track listing
Digital download
"Avenir" – 3:03

Digital EP
"Jour 1" – 3:36
"Avenir" – 3:15
"Maman" – 2:41
"Jour 1" (Dan Black Alternative) – 3:07
"Jour 1" (Gostan Remix) – 3:16

CD single
"Avenir" (Radio Edit) – 3:03
"Avenir" – 3:15

Chart performance

Weekly charts

Year-end charts

Certifications

References

2014 singles
2014 songs
French-language songs
French pop songs
Alternative R&B songs
Mercury Records singles
SNEP Top Singles number-one singles
Louane (singer) songs